An endling is the last known individual of a species or subspecies. Once the endling dies, the species becomes extinct. The word was coined in correspondence in the scientific journal Nature. Alternative names put forth for the last individual of its kind include ender and terminarch.

The word relict may also be used, but usually refers to a population, rather than an individual, that is the last of a species.

Usage
The 4 April 1996 issue of Nature published a correspondence in which commentators suggested that a new word, endling, be adopted to denote the last individual of a species. The 23 May issue of Nature published several counter-suggestions, including ender, terminarch, and relict.

The word endling appeared on the walls of the National Museum of Australia in Tangled Destinies, a 2001 exhibition by Matt Kirchman and Scott Guerin, about the relationship between Australian peoples and their land. In the exhibition, the definition, as it appeared in Nature, was printed in large letters on the wall above two specimens of the extinct Tasmanian tiger: "Endling (n.) The last surviving individual of a species of animal or plant". A printed description of this exhibition offered a similar definition, omitting reference to plants: "An endling is the name given to an animal that is the last of its species."

In The Flight of the Emu: A Hundred Years of Australian Ornithology 1901-2001, author Libby Robin stated that "the very last individual of a species" is "what scientists refer to as an 'endling'".

In 2011, the word was used in the Earth Island Journal, in an essay by Eric Freedman entitled "Extinction Is Forever: A Quest for the Last Known Survivors".  Freedman defined endling as "the last known specimen of her species."

In The Sense of an Endling, author Helen Lewis describes the notion of an endling as poignant, and the word as "wonderfully Tolkien-esque".

Author Eric Freedman describes endling as "a word with finality", stating, "It is deep-to-the-bone chilling to know the exact date a species disappeared from Earth. It is even more ghastly to look upon the place where it happened and know that nobody knew or cared at the time what had transpired and why."

Notable endlings
This is not a comprehensive list of contemporary extinction, but a list of high-profile, widely publicised examples of when the last individual of a species was known.

Birds 

 The passenger pigeon (Ectopistes migratorius) became extinct at 1 p.m. on 1 September 1914 with the death of Martha, the last surviving member of the species, at the Cincinnati Zoo.
 Incas, the last known Carolina parakeet (Conuropsis carolinensis), died, also at the Cincinnati Zoo, on 21 February 1918. The species was officially declared extinct in 1939.
 Booming Ben, a solitary heath hen (Tympanuchus cupido cupido), was last seen 11 March 1932 on Martha's Vineyard, Massachusetts.
 Orange Band was the last known dusky seaside sparrow (Ammodramus maritumus nigrescens) who died on 17 June 1987 at the Discovery Island zoological park at Walt Disney World Resort.

Mammals 
 In 1627, the last aurochs, an ancestor of bovine and cattle, died in a forest near what is now Jaktorów in modern-day Poland.

 The quagga (Equus quagga quagga) became extinct in the wild in the late 1870s due to hunting for meat and skins, and the subspecies' endling died in captivity on 12 August 1883 at the Artis in Amsterdam.

 On 7 September 1936, the last known thylacine (Thylacinus cynocephalus), also called the Tasmanian tiger, died in Hobart Zoo, after the species was hunted to extinction by farmers. It has been suggested this individual, erroneously called "Benjamin", died of neglect during a night of unusually extreme weather conditions in Tasmania. it was also the last living individual of the family Thylacinidae.
 Celia, the last Pyrenean ibex (Capra pyrenaica pyrenaica), was found dead on 6 January 2000 in the Spanish Pyrenees, after hunting and competition from livestock reduced the population to one individual.

Reptiles and amphibians 

 On 24 June 2012, Lonesome George, who was the last known Pinta Island tortoise (Chelonoidis niger abingdonii), died in his habitat in the Galápagos Islands.
 Until September 26, 2016, the Atlanta Botanical Garden was home to the last known surviving Rabbs' fringe-limbed treefrog (Ecnomiohyla rabborum) named "Toughie".

 After being considered possibly extinct for 113 years, a Fernandina Island Galápagos tortoise was found in 2019. However, this female is the only confirmed individual.

Invertebrates 
 Turgi was the last Partula turgida, a Polynesian tree snail, who died on 31 January 1996 in the London Zoo.
 A tank in the Bristol Zoo was the last refuge of Partula faba, a land snail from Ra'iātea in French Polynesia. The population dropped from 38 in 2012 to one in 2015. The last individual died on 21 February 2016.
 George was the last known individual of the Oahu tree snail species Achatinella apexfulva. It died on January 1, 2019, in captivity near Kailua, Hawaii.

Plants
 The Curepipe Botanic Gardens in Mauritius have housed the last specimen of the palm Hyophorbe amaricaulis since the 1950s.
 Pennantia baylisiana has only ever been known from one wild tree that still lives today. Subsequent trees were cloned, but since 1985 hundreds of trees have been propagated by self-pollination. 
 Only one individual of the Wood's cycad (Encephalartos woodii) has existed since it was discovered in 1895, all examples being clones of this single male individual.
 Only one living specimen of the tree species Madhuca diplostemon is known to exist.

See also

 Anthropocene
 Conservation status
 De-extinction
 Extinction
 Frozen zoo (some store genetic material from endlings)
 Holocene extinction
 Lists of extinct animals
 List of neologisms
 Rare species
 Rememberer

References

External links

 What Do You Call the Last of a Species? by Michelle Nijhuis for The New Yorker
 Cut from history by Eric Freedman for Knight Center for Environmental Journalism
 Bringing Them Back to Life by Carl Zimmer for National Geographic Magazine.

Animals by conservation status
Extinction